A-68930 is a synthetic compound that acts as a selective dopamine receptor D1 agonist. It is orally active and has antidepressant and anorectic effects in animals, producing wakefulness and tachycardia, but without stimulant effects, instead producing sedation. The difference in effects between A-68930 and other D1 agonists such as SKF-82958 may be due to their differing effects on the related D5 receptor.

References 

D1-receptor agonists
Isochromenes
Catechols
Phenylethanolamine ethers